The Joker is the eighth studio album by Steve Miller Band. The album was recorded at Capitol Studios and released by Capitol Records in October 1973. The album marked a period of significant change for the group as the band abandoned their psychedelic-oriented music for a more melodic, smooth rock/blues sound. It was also their first solid commercial success due to the strong radio-play of the title track. The album reached No. 2 on the Billboard Top LPs & Tape chart and has been certified Platinum in the United States. It reached No. 1 on the Cash Box Albums Charts on January 8, 1974.

Reception

Stephen Thomas Erlewine of AllMusic rated The Joker three out of five stars, calling it "all bright and fun, occasionally truly silly". He also stated that it "isn't mind-expanding", but concluded by saying that it "nevertheless maintains its good-time vibe so well that it's hard not to smile along...provided you're on the same wavelength as Miller, of course."

Record World said of the single "Your Cash Ain't Nothin' But Trash" "A dynamic rocker, it ain't nothin' but the best!"

Track listing

Personnel
 Steve Miller – guitar, vocals, harmonica
 Gerald Johnson – bass guitar (all but 8), vocals
 Dick Thompson – organ, clavinet
 John King – drums

Additional personnel
 Lonnie Turner – bass guitar (8)
 "Sneaky" Pete Kleinow – pedal steel guitar (9)
 John Van Hamersveld and Norman Seeff – album cover design
 Norman Seeff – photography

Charts

Certifications

References

1973 albums
Steve Miller Band albums
Capitol Records albums
Albums recorded at Capitol Studios